United Nations Security Council Resolution 191, adopted on June 18, 1964, after reiterating its previous requests of the Republic of South Africa and again condemning apartheid, the Council decided to establish a Group of Experts made up of representatives of all the then current members of the Council to study the feasibility and effectiveness of measures which could be taken by the Council under the Charter.  The Council also invited the Secretary-General to establish education and training programs for South Africans abroad.

The resolution was adopted with eight votes to none; Czechoslovakia, France and the Soviet Union abstained.

See also
List of United Nations Security Council Resolutions 101 to 200 (1953–1965)
South Africa under apartheid

References

External links
 
Text of the Resolution at undocs.org

 0191
 0191
1964 in South Africa
June 1964 events